Varuthapadatha Valibar Sangam is a 2013 Indian Tamil-language romantic comedy film directed by Ponram, in his directorial debut. Produced by P. Madan under the Escape Artists Motion Pictures banner, it stars Sivakarthikeyan, Sathyaraj, Sri Divya and Soori in prominent roles. The music for the film is composed by D. Imman, with cinematography handled by Balasubramaniem and editing done by Vivek Harshan. M. Rajesh wrote the dialogues for the film.

The principal photography which took place in Padalur, Theni, Tiruchi and Chennai, was completed in July 2013. The film was released on 6 September 2013, coinciding with the Ganesh Chathurthi weekend and became an critical and commercial success. The film was remade in Kannada as Adyaksha and in Telugu as Current Theega.

Plot
The film begins with police arriving at Sivanandi's house questioning him about killing his daughter Lathapandi because she ran away with the guy she loved. Bosepandi and Kodi are two friends who are the leaders of a group called Varuthapadadha Valibar Sangam. One day, Bosepandi falls in love with Kalyani who is a teacher at a school. Bosepandi writes a love letter for her but wants someone to go give it to her so that's when he finds Lathapandi. Lathapandi gives the letter to her teacher and tricks Bosepandi into believing many things.

Sivanandi fixes a marriage for Lathapandi but she is not willing to marry because she is very young and she wants to study further. Despite her attempts, nothing stops her marriage. Her marriage is posted on a billboard which Bosepandi and Kodi decide to stop since they want their group billboard on there. They go to the police station and threaten the police that they will go to the commissioner. The police talks to Sivanandi and makes him stop the marriage. One day, Lathapandi delivers the news to Bosepandi that Kalyani is getting married. He decides to move on in life, so he arranges for a Dindigul programme to happen in his area. He sees Lathapandi in a sari and immediately falls in love with her. The same night, the police reveal to Sivanandi that the person who stopped Lathapandi's marriage was Bosepandi.

A day later he tells her about his love for her but she ignores him and says no. Bosepandi walks away listening to a sad song when a gang comes and bashes him. He later finds out that it was Sivanandi's gang who hit him. So, Bosepandi and Kodi decide to steal what Sivanandi considers his 'soul' and that is his gun. Bosepandi and Kodi steal the gun and run away and cause a lot of trouble. Bosepandi then tells Lathapandi that he will return the gun if she comes to their friends' marriage and so he returns the gun without anyone knowing. Lathapandi in return goes to that marriage and takes many photos with Bosepandi. Her mother warns her that this is not correct and she should stop it. Sivanandi's cow falls into a well when he goes out of town so Bosepandi helps to get it out. That night he stays with Lathapandi in her house and they see Sivanandi sleepwalking. After that, they wake up in the morning and they see Sivanandi walking again. This time he is awake but Bosepandi thinks he's sleepwalking again and so he tells Sivanandi about liking his daughter. Once Bosepandi finds out that Sivanandi is indeed awake, he runs out of that house.

Sivanandi then makes Lathapandi promise that she will only marry the guy who Sivanandi tells her to marry and so she does promise her dad. They fix marriage for Lathapandi but on the night before her marriage, she decides to run away with Bosepandi. When running away at night, they see Sivanandi and he tells them to run away and gives them some money so that they never come back. Sivanandi wants Bosepandi and Lathapandi to run away because he doesn't want Lathapandi to marry the guy he has chosen for her and he can't stop her marriage because he has too much respect in his village. He watches them get married and settled in a hill area. Sivanandi comes to visit the couple every day. On one visit, it is revealed that Lathapandi is pregnant. Bosepandi and Lathapandi then return to the village because Bosepandi's father had offered him more money than Sivanandi. Then the film ends with everyone laugh on each other.

Cast

 Sivakarthikeyan as Bosepandi M.A M.Phil., President of Varuthapadatha Valibar Sangam
 Sathyaraj as Sivanaandi, Bosepandi's rival and richest man in Silukkuvarpatti
 Sri Divya as Lathapandi, Bosepandi's love interest , wife and Sivanandi's youngest daughter
 Soori as Kodi, Bosepandi's best friend and Secretary of Varuthapadatha Valibar Sangam
 Soundararaja as Pulichathanni, Sangam senior member
 Shaalu Shammu as Namitha, Kodi's lover & Lathapandi's schoolmate
 Rajendran as Koormayi, Sivanandi's enemy and Bosepandi's father's brother
 Sriranjini as Dhanalakshmi, Lathapandi's mother
 Swaminathan as Lawyer Veerasamy, an advocate of Varuthapadatha Valibar Sangam 
 Elango Kumaravel as a Police constable
 Yaar Kannan as Bosepandi's father
 Dhandapani as Sivanandi's sidekick
 Thavasi as Kodi's father
 Subramaniyapuram Raja as Sivanaandi's sidekick
 Hello Kandasamy as Sivanaandi's sidekick
 Vinodhini Vaidyanathan as Inspector Bharathi
 Joe Malloori as Police Inspector
 Naadodigal Gopal
 Bindu Madhavi as Kalyani Teacher(special appearance)
 Anthony Daasan (special appearance in the song "Varuthapadatha Valibar Sangam")

Production 
The film's shooting was held in various places of Padalur, Theni, Trichy and Chennai. Ponram, an erstwhile assistant of director M. Rajesh, made his directorial debut through this film. Sri Divya, who worked as a child artist in Hanuman Junction (2000) and Yuvaraaju (2001), made her debut in this film as a lead actress. Sathyaraj and Soori, were roped in to play pivotal roles. The final leg of shooting was completed on 8 July 2013.

Soundtrack

The music is composed by D. Imman, collaborating with Sivakarthikeyan for the second time after Manam Kothi Paravai, and his first collaboration with director Ponram. The soundtrack album features five songs written by Yugabharathi, with a dubstep and three karaoke versions, thus making it to nine tracks in total. Sivakarthikeyan sung the title track "Varuthapadaatha Vaalibar Sangam", along with Anthony Daasan, making his debut in playback singing. The audio launch of the film, took place on 19 July 2013, at Sathyam Cinemas in Chennai, along with the audio of Desingu Raja and Thanga Meenkal. The event was attended by Dhanush, Anirudh Ravichander and A. R. Murugadoss, alongside the film's cast and crew, where Dhanush released the audio CD, and received to Murugadoss. A trailer and two songs from the film were screened at the event.

The track "Oodha Color Ribbon" received the most consumer response. Behindwoods, gave a rating of 2.75 out of 5, stating "The album made for onscreen enjoyment". while Indiaglitz gave a rating of 3.25 out of 5, wrote "Overall one for the mass and fun factor". Moviecrow rated 7.5 out of 10, stating "Imman's songs are perfect for such a film with both the title song and the now almost mandatory fast beat number before the climax being foot tapping." S. R. Ashok Kumar from The Hindu, stated that "VVS songs is surely set to lift your mood." Following by the record number of sales of the soundtrack, the album was ranked in the eighth position of "Top 25 Albums of 2013" by Behindwoods.

Track listing

Release
Varuthapadaatha Vaalibar Sangam was released on 6 September 2013, which coincides with the following Vinayagar Chathurthi weekend. The film was released in 340+ screens worldwide, the widest release for Sivakarthikeyan till then. The Tamil Nadu theatrical rights were purchased by Gopuram Films, while the overseas rights were sold to Khafa Exports. The film's television premiere took place on 14 January 2014, coinciding with the Pongal festival on Kalaignar TV, which bought the film's satellite rights, and registered a TRP rating of 12.29. The film's Hindi dubbing rights were bought by Goldmines Telefilms, titled as Main Tujhpe Qurban and released in September 2019.

Marketing 
The first look poster of the film was released on 14 June 2013. A making video of the title song, sung by Sivakarthikeyan was released on 15 July 2013. The theatrical trailer of the film was released on 19 July 2013, at the film's audio launch event. The trailer received positive responses. Another new teaser was released on 10 August 2013. The song teasers of the film were unveiled few days before the film's release.

Reception

Critical reception 
The film received highly positive reviews from critics. Baradwaj Rangan writing for The Hindu stated wrote, "The film has enough silliness to qualify as mild amusement, especially in the scenes with Bosepandi and his friend Kodi (Soori) — but these gags would work just as well as a compilation clip on YouTube. The plotting is too loose to warrant a two-hour-and-forty-minute movie, with sentimental detours and meandering subplots". Behindwoods rated 2.75 out of 5 and wrote, "Charmingly mischievous Siva Karthikeyan, comical Soori and the majestic Sathyaraj make VVS a jolly good entertainer." The Times of India rated 3 out of 5, stating "What makes this a rather predictable film appealing to an extent is the lighthearted manner in which Ponram tells his story."

Indiaglitz stated "The film's biggest strength is Sathyaraj, and the climax alone is enough to show his strength. The man who has shifted gears towards character roles is doing a good job out of it. Siva again, it is a wonder to see this guy in yet another healthy fun movie," and gave a rating of 3 out of 5. Rediff gave a rating of 2 out of 5 and summarised, "Varuthapadatha Valibar Sangam is boring and gets repetitive after a while". Sify gave a rating of 2.75 out of 5 stating, "Ponram through VVS follows the comedy template set by his guru Rajesh and blends them with his hero Sivakarthikeyan's image. Add D Imman's peppy melodies with a rural touch and you get a mass comedy entertainer" International Business Times gave a verdict stating "Good Entertainer, Worth a Watch". The New Indian Express wrote, "A promising work by a debutant, the film though not the best of comedies, makes for a fairly pleasant watch" with a rating of 2.5 out of 5.

Box office
Varuthapadatha Valibar Sangam had the biggest opening in Sivakarthikeyan's career at the time of its release; it earned approximately 3.55 crore net on its first day. According to Sify, the film, which released in 343 screens in Tamil Nadu, took  3.25 Cr in its first three days and had collected  11.5 Cr after 17 days at the Tamil Nadu box office. The film was considered financially successful. The film completed 50 days of theatrical run in 25 centres across Tamil Nadu.

Awards and nominations 
8th Vijay Awards

 Best Comedian - Soori (Nominated)
 Best Debut Actress - Sri Divya (Nominated)
 Best Music Director - D. Imman (Nominated)
 Entertainer of the Year - Sivakarthikeyan
 Favourite Film (Nominated)
 Favourite Song - "Oodha Color Ribbon"
3rd South Indian International Movie Awards

 Best Debut Actress - Sri Divya
 Best Actor in a Supporting Role - Sathyaraj (Nominated)
 Best Comedian - Soori
 Best Music Director - D. Imman
 Best Male Playback Singer - Hariharasudan for "Oodha Color Ribbon" (Nominated)
 Best Dance Choreographer - Dinesh for "Oodha Color Ribbon" (Nominated)
61st Filmfare Awards South

 Best Music Director - D. Imman (Nominated)

Remakes 
The film was remade by Nanda Kishore in Kannada as Adyaksha, starring Sharan in the lead role and was released in 2014. At the same year, the film's Telugu remake was helmed by G. Nageswara Reddy, starring Manchu Manoj in the lead role and was titled as Current Theega.

Legacy 
A comic book on this film was published by Navneetha Publications in August 2018, and was made available at the Discovery Book Palace, located at YMCA, Nandanam, Chennai. This is the third Tamil film to have a comic book series of the same title, followed by Muthu, Baahubali, Ra.One and Indrajith. In a scene from the Tamil film Maan Karate also starring Sivakarthikeyan, Yogi Babu teases Hansika by singing Oodha Colour Ribbon. In the 2016 film Rajinimurugan, also directed by Ponram, Sivakarthikeyan plays the title character and reprised his role of Bosepandi for a cameo at the ending.

References

External links
 

2013 films
Films shot in Tiruchirappalli
Tamil films remade in other languages
Indian romantic comedy films
2010s Tamil-language films
Indian nonlinear narrative films
Films scored by D. Imman
2013 romantic comedy films
2013 directorial debut films
Films adapted into comics